Arab traders have been visiting the Philippines for about 2,000 years, 
playing a prominent role in the trade networks of the time. They used Southeast Asia for stopovers and trading posts. Since the 14th century, Arab travelers such as Makhdun Karim is known to have reached the Philippines and brought Islam to the region. They moved from the southern islands such as Mindanao and traveled towards the north and converted the Filipinos to Islam, many of these early Arabs married Filipina women.

That same century Syrian Arabs also brought Christianity to the region along with pre-Islamic belief systems. An estimated 2% of the population of the Philippines, about 2.2 million people, could claim partial Arab ancestry.

History
Arab traders have been visiting Philippines for nearly 2,000 years. Since the 14th century Arab travelers had traded extensively with local chiefs, datos and rajahs. During the advent of Islam into Southeast Asia, Makhdum Karim, the first Islamic missionary to reach the Sulu Archipelago, brought Islam to what is now the Philippines, first arriving in Tawi-Tawi.

Arab and Persian traders passed by the Philippines, on their way to Guangzhou, China. Subsequent visits of Arab Muslim missionaries strengthened the Islamic faith in the Philippines, concentrating in the south and reaching as far north as Manila. According to the Syrian Consulate in Makati, the first Orthodox Christians on the islands were Syrian and Lebanese merchants and sailors, who arrived in Manila after the city was opened to international trade. Many of the Lebanese sailors married local women and their descendants have since become Philippine citizens.

Political and economic relations were enhanced in the 1970s between the Philippines and Arab nations, this was during the period of oil shocks and political instability in the Middle East. This led to closer collaboration between the countries and led to an increase in Philippine laborers working in the Middle East.

In recent times, another wave of Arabs to arrive in the Philippines were refugees from war-torn nations, such as Lebanon (undergoing civil war in the 1980s) and Arab other nations involved in the Gulf War in 1991. While other Arabs were entrepreneurs who intend to set up businesses. Filipinos with Arab descent live primarily in Mindanao, while the more recent immigrants live in Manila.

Cesar Majul
Filipino author Cesar Adib Majul, the son of a Greek Orthodox Christian immigrant from Syria, converted to Islam in his late adulthood. He became a prominent historian on the Muslim Moro people and the history of Islam in the Philippines and wrote many books about Moros and Islam.

Notable people

Several movie and TV celebrities are also of Arab descent: Charlie Davao (real name: Carlos Wahib Valdez Davao; Jordanian from maternal grandmother's side), Dawn Zulueta (real name: Rachel Marie Salman Taleon; Palestinian from maternal grandfather's side), Kuh Ledesma (of Lebanese lineage), Ana Roces (real name: Marinella Adad; Lebanese), Uma Khouny (Palestinian), Yasmien Kurdi (Lebanese), Jessy Mendiola (real name: Jessica Mendiola Tawile; Lebanese), Gazini Ganados (real name: Gazini Christiana Jordi Acopiado Ganados; Palestinian), Mona Louise Rey (real name Mona Al-Alawi; Bahraini) and her older sister Ivana Alawi, and Zeinab Harake (Lebanese) and Basel Manadil (Syrian).

See also
Arab diaspora
Arab Christians
Islam in the Philippines
Philippine Orthodox Church

References

 
Arab diaspora in Asia